Water polo has been part of the Summer Olympics program since the second games, in 1900. A women's water polo tournament was introduced for the 2000 Summer Olympics. Hungary has been the most successful country in men's tournament, while the United States is the only team to win multiple times at the women's tournament since its introduction. Italy is the first and only country to win both the men's and women's water polo tournaments.

History

The history of water polo as a team sport began in mid 19th century England and Scotland, where water sports were a feature of county fairs and festivals. Water polo has been included in every Summer Olympic Games as a men's competition sport, except 1896. Women's water polo made its debut in the Summer Olympics in 2000.

Beginnings

Men's water polo was among the first team sports introduced at the modern Olympic Games in 1900. Seven European teams from four countries, including four from the host nation France, took part in the competition. The British team was the inaugural champion.

At the 1904 Summer Olympics, a water polo tournament was contested, three club teams of seven players each entered. A German team tried to enter, but its entry was refused because the players did not play for the same club. The event took place in a pond in Forest Park, the location of both the Olympics and the World's Fair. Previously, the International Olympic Committee and International Swimming Federation (FINA) considered the water polo event at the 1904 Olympics as a demonstration sport. However, in July 2021, after accepting the recommendation of Olympic historian Bill Mallon, the IOC recognized water polo along with several others as an official sport of the 1904 Olympic program. Water polo was not played at the 1906 Olympics.

From 1908 to 1920, the Great Britain men's national water polo team won three consecutive gold medals at the Olympics, becoming the first water polo team to have an Olympic winning streak (winning three or more Olympic titles in a row).

Hungarian dominance
Hungary men's national water polo team has participated in 22 of 27 Olympic tournaments, with fifteen Olympic medals (nine gold, three silver and three bronze). From 1928 to 1980, the Hungarians won twelve consecutive medals in water polo. Twenty years later, the team won three golds in a row between 2000 and 2008, becoming the second team to have an Olympic winning streak in water polo.

Blood in the Water match

The most famous water polo match in Olympic history often referred to as the Blood in the Water match, was a 1956 Summer Olympics semi-final match between Hungary and the Soviet Union, played in Melbourne on 6 December 1956. As the athletes left for the games, the Hungarian revolution began, and the Soviet army crushed the uprising. The match was bloody and violent. The Hungarians defeated the Soviets 4–0 before the game was called off in the final minute to prevent angry Hungarians in the crowd reacting to Soviet player Valentin Prokopov punching Hungarian player Ervin Zádor. Pictures of Zádor's injuries were published around the world, leading to the "Blood in the Water" moniker.

The Hungarians went on to win the Olympic gold medal by defeating Yugoslavia 2–1 in the final.

Addition of women's program
Women's water polo became an Olympic sport at the 2000 Sydney Olympics. Six nations competed in the women's tournament with home team Australia winning the gold medal over the United States.

From 2012 to 2021, the United States women's team won three consecutive gold medals at the Summer Olympics, becoming the first women's water polo team to have an Olympic winning streak.

Geography

Water polo is now popular in many countries around the world, notably Europe (particularly in Croatia, France, Germany, Greece, Hungary, Italy, Malta, Montenegro, the Netherlands, Romania, Russia, Serbia and Spain), Australia, Brazil, Canada and the United States.

As of the 2020 Summer Olympics, 51 National Olympic Committees (NOCs) from six continents have sent their water polo teams to the Olympic Games. Men's water polo teams of European NOCs won all 27 official tournaments, while women's teams from Europe, North America and Oceania won all six gold medals. Water polo teams from Africa, Asia and South America have not won an Olympic medal yet.

Venues

For the Summer Olympics, there are 34 venues that have been or will be used for water polo.

The Seine in Paris hosted the first water polo competitions at the 1900 Olympics. The Forest Park in St. Louis hosted the water polo events for the 1904 Summer Olympics.

The first water polo venue not located on a river or a lake took place at the 1908 London Olympics. It was not until the 1920 Olympics that a separate venue was created for the aquatic venues. The 1948 Games were the first Olympics in which water polo took place both indoors and in more than one venue. The first separate water polo venue that was not connected to other aquatic venues was at the 1964 Tokyo Olympics.

The Water Polo Arena of the 2012 London Olympics was the first dedicated water polo venue to be built for an Olympics, the structure was taken down after the games.

  Paris 1900: Seine, Paris
  St. Louis 1904: Forest Park, St. Louis
  London 1908: White City Stadium, White City
  Stockholm 1912: Djurgårdsbrunnsviken, Stockholm
  Antwerp 1920: Stade Nautique d'Antwerp, Antwerp
  Paris 1924: Piscine des Tourelles, Paris
  Amsterdam 1928: Olympic Sports Park Swim Stadium, Amsterdam
  Los Angeles 1932: Swimming Stadium, Los Angeles
  Berlin 1936: Olympic Swimming Stadium, Berlin
  London 1948: Empire Pool (final), Wembley; and Finchley Lido, North Finchley
  Helsinki 1952: Swimming Stadium, Helsinki
  Melbourne 1956: Swimming/Diving Stadium, Melbourne
  Rome 1960: Piscina delle Rose and Stadio Olimpico del Nuoto (final), both in Rome
  Tokyo 1964: Tokyo Metropolitan Indoor Swimming Pool, Tokyo
  Mexico City 1968: Francisco Márquez Olympic Pool (final) and University City Swimming Pool, both in Mexico City
  Munich 1972: Dantebad and Schwimmhalle (final), both in Munich
  Montreal 1976: Complexe sportif Claude-Robillard and Olympic Pool (final), both in Montreal
  Moscow 1980: Swimming Pool - Moscow and Swimming Pool - Olimpiysky (final), both in Moscow
  Los Angeles 1984: Raleigh Runnels Memorial Pool, Malibu, California
  Seoul 1988: Jamsil Indoor Swimming Pool, Seoul
  Barcelona 1992: Piscina Municipal de Montjuïc and Piscines Bernat Picornell (final), both in Barcelona
  Atlanta 1996: Georgia Tech Aquatic Center, Atlanta
  Sydney 2000: Ryde Aquatic Leisure Centre, Ryde; and Sydney International Aquatic Centre, Sydney
  Athens 2004: Athens Olympic Aquatic Centre, Athens
  Beijing 2008: Ying Tung Natatorium, Beijing
  London 2012: Water Polo Arena, London
  Rio de Janeiro 2016: Maria Lenk Aquatics Centre and Olympic Aquatics Stadium, Rio de Janeiro
  Tokyo 2020: Tokyo Tatsumi International Swimming Center, Tokyo

Sources:
 Official Reports (PDF): 1900–1996;
 Official Results Books (PDF): 2000–2016;
 Olympedia: Water polo venues.

Events
Notes
The X indicates that the tournament was held as a full Olympic medal sport.
The bullet denotes that it was contested as an unofficial sport.

Rules

Qualification
Since 2012, the qualifying process consists of five stages:
 The team of the host nation qualifies automatically.
 No more than one team qualifies as the top team in the FINA World League.
 No more than three teams qualify as the top teams in the World Aquatics Championships.
 No more than five teams qualify as the continental Olympic qualification tournament champions.
 No more than four teams qualify through a world qualifying tournament, in which the best teams which did not qualify directly from each continent compete for the remaining berths.

Players

Eligibility
According to the FINA General Rules, the list below shows the requirements for a player to be eligible to play in international tournaments:

 "GR 1.1: All competitors shall be registered with their National Federation to be eligible to compete."
 "GR 2.5: When a competitor or competition official represents his/her country in a competition, he/she shall be a citizen, whether by birth or naturalisation, of the nation he/she represents, provided that a naturalised citizen shall have lived in that country for at least one year prior to that competition. Competitors, who have more than one nationality according to the laws of the respective nations must choose one 'Sport Nationality'. This choice shall be exercised by the first representation of the competitor for one of the countries."
 "GR 2.6: Any competitor or competition official changing his sport nationality from one national governing body to another must have resided in the territory of and been under the jurisdiction of the latter for at least twelve months prior to his first representation for the country."

Competition format
For both the men's and women's tournaments at the 2020 Olympics (which was postponed to 2021 due to the COVID-19 pandemic), the competition consists of a round-robin group stage followed by a knockout stage. Teams are placed into two groups, with each team playing each other team in its group once. Teams earn 2 points for a win, 1 point for a draw, and 0 points for a loss. The top four teams in each group advance to the knockout rounds. The knockout rounds are a single-elimination tournament consisting of quarterfinals, semifinals, and the gold and bronze medal matches.

Matches consist of four quarters of eight minutes each. During the knockout rounds, if the score is tied after four quarters (32 minutes), penalty shootouts, which is 5 rounds, plus extra rounds if tied, are used to determine the winner.

Sources:
 Official Reports (PDF): 1900–1996;
 Official Results Books (PDF): 2000–2016;
 Olympedia: 1900–2016;
 Sports Reference: 1900–2016.

Game rules

Maximum number of players per team

Sources:
 Official Reports (PDF): 1900–1996;
 Official Results Books (PDF): 2000–2016.

Anti-doping

The FINA follows the World Anti-Doping Agency's (WADA) regulations on performance-enhancing drugs. According to the WADA, a positive in-competition test results in disqualification of the player and a suspension that varies based on the number of offences. When a player tests positive, the rest of their team is subjected to testing; another positive test can result in a disqualification of the entire team.

Men's tournament

Results summary

Sources:
 Official Reports (PDF): 1900–1996 (men's tournaments);
 Official Results Books (PDF): 2000–2020 (men's tournaments);
 Olympedia: 1900–2020 (men's tournaments);
 Sports Reference: 1900–2016 (men's tournaments).

Confederation statistics

Best performances by tournament

Team statistics

Comprehensive team results by tournament

Finishes in the top four

Medal table

Champions (results, squads)

Champions (results)
Champions (squads)

Team records

Player statistics

Multiple appearances (five-time Olympians)

Multiple medalists

Multiple gold medalists

Top goalscorers (one match, one tournament, all-time)
Top goalscorers (one match)

Top goalscorers (one tournament)

Top goalscorers (all-time)

Top goalkeepers (one match, one tournament, all-time)
Top goalkeepers (one match)

Top goalkeepers (one tournament)

Top goalkeepers (all-time)

Coach statistics

Most successful coaches

Medals as coach and player

Women's tournament

Results summary

Sources:
 Official Results Books (PDF): 2000–2016 (women's tournaments);
 Olympedia: 2000–2016 (women's tournaments);
 Sports Reference: 2000–2016 (women's tournaments).

Confederation statistics

Best performances by tournament

Team statistics

Comprehensive team results by tournament

Finishes in the top four

Medal table

Champions (results, squads)

Champions (results)

Champions (squads)

Team records

Player statistics

Multiple appearances (four-time Olympians)

Multiple medalists

Multiple gold medalists

Top goalscorers (one match, one tournament, all-time)
Top goalscorers (one match)

Top goalscorers (one tournament)

Top goalscorers (all-time)

Top goalkeepers (one match, one tournament, all-time)
Top goalkeepers (one match)

Top goalkeepers (one tournament)

Top goalkeepers (all-time)

Coach statistics

Most successful coaches

Medals as coach and player

Overall medal table
The following table is pre-sorted by number of Olympic gold medals (in descending order), number of Olympic silver medals (in descending order), number of Olympic bronze medals (in descending order), name of the NOC (in ascending order), respectively. Last updated: 31 December 2021.

Italy is the only country to win both the men's and women's water polo tournaments at the Summer Olympics. Italy men's national team won gold medals at the 1948, 1960 and 1992 Olympics, while the women's team was Olympic champions in 2004.

Legend
 NOC◊ – NOC that won medals in both the men's and women's tournaments
 NOC† – Defunct NOC

Winning two medals in one edition of the Games
As of the 2020 Summer Olympics, four NOCs won two medals in one edition of the Games.

Legend
  – Hosts

Water polo people at the opening and closing ceremonies

Flag bearers

Some sportspeople were chosen to carry the national flag of their country at the opening and closing ceremonies of the Olympic Games. As of the 2020 Summer Olympics, thirty water polo people from six continents were given the honour. Among them, three flag bearers won the tournament with his/her team.

Charles Smith, representing Great Britain, was the first water polo player to be a flag bearer at the opening and closing ceremonies of the Olympics.

Six-time Olympian Manuel Estiarte of Spain was the flag bearer during the opening ceremony at the 2000 Summer Olympics in Sydney.

After winning gold in the women's tournament, Carmela Allucci, the captain of the Italian women's water polo team, carried the national flag of Italy at the closing ceremony of the 2004 Summer Olympics, becoming the first female water polo player to be given the honour.

Legend
  – Opening ceremony of the 2008 Summer Olympics
  – Closing ceremony of the 2012 Summer Olympics
  – Hosts
  – Female flag bearer
 Flag bearer‡ – Flag bearer who won the tournament with his/her team

Oath takers

Some sportspeople from the host nations were chosen to take the Olympic Oath at the opening ceremonies of the Olympic Games. As of the 2020 Summer Olympics, four water polo people were given the honour.

As an athlete, Victor Boin of Belgium took the first ever Olympic Oath at the 1920 Games in Antwerp.

Eugeni Asensio, a Spanish water polo referee, took the Officials' Oath at the 1992 Summer Olympics in Barcelona.

As a water polo referee, Australian Peter Kerr took the Officials' Oath at the 2000 Sydney Olympics.

Asumi Tsuzaki of Japan took the Officials' Oath at the 2020 Summer Olympics in Tokyo, becoming the first female water polo referee to be given the honour.

Legend
  – Hosts
  – Female oath taker
 Oath taker‡ – Oath taker who won the tournament with his/her team

See also

 Lists of Olympic water polo records and statistics
 List of men's Olympic water polo tournament records and statistics
 List of women's Olympic water polo tournament records and statistics
 List of Olympic champions in men's water polo
 List of Olympic champions in women's water polo
 National team appearances in the men's Olympic water polo tournament
 National team appearances in the women's Olympic water polo tournament
 List of players who have appeared in multiple men's Olympic water polo tournaments
 List of players who have appeared in multiple women's Olympic water polo tournaments
 List of Olympic medalists in water polo (men)
 List of Olympic medalists in water polo (women)
 List of men's Olympic water polo tournament top goalscorers
 List of women's Olympic water polo tournament top goalscorers
 List of men's Olympic water polo tournament goalkeepers
 List of women's Olympic water polo tournament goalkeepers
 List of Olympic venues in water polo

 Water polo at the World Aquatics Championships
 FINA Water Polo World Rankings
 List of water polo world medalists
 Major achievements in water polo by nation

Notes

References

Sources

Official Reports (IOC)
PDF documents in the LA84 Foundation Digital Library:

 Official Report of the 1896 Olympic Games (download, archive)
 Official Report of the 1900 Olympic Games (download, archive)
 Official Report of the 1904 Olympic Games (download, archive)
 Official Report of the 1908 Olympic Games (download, archive) (pp. 359–361)
 Official Report of the 1912 Olympic Games (download, archive) (pp. 1021–1024, 1031–1037)
 Official Report of the 1920 Olympic Games (download, archive) (p. 130)
 Official Report of the 1924 Olympic Games (download, archive) (pp. 439–440, 486–494)
 Official Report of the 1928 Olympic Games (download, archive) (pp. 746–757, 797–807)
 Official Report of the 1932 Olympic Games (download, archive) (pp. 619–623, 646–652)
 Official Report of the 1936 Olympic Games, v.2 (download, archive) (pp. 345–356)
 Official Report of the 1948 Olympic Games (download, archive) (pp. 537–540, 640–647)
 Official Report of the 1952 Olympic Games (download, archive) (pp. 600–608)
 Official Report of the 1956 Olympic Games (download, archive) (pp. 592–594, 624–627)
 Official Report of the 1960 Olympic Games (download, archive) (pp. 552–555, 617–634)
 Official Report of the 1964 Olympic Games, v.2 (download, archive) (pp. 682–698)
 Official Report of the 1968 Olympic Games, v.3 (download, archive) (pp. 449–466, 811–826)
 Official Report of the 1972 Olympic Games, v.3 (download, archive) (pp. 331, 353–365)
 Official Report of the 1976 Olympic Games, v.3 (download, archive) (pp. 446–447, 484–497)
 Official Report of the 1980 Olympic Games, v.3 (download, archive) (pp. 458, 495–510)
 Official Report of the 1984 Olympic Games, v.2 (download, archive) (pp. 528–534)
 Official Report of the 1988 Olympic Games, v.2 (download, archive) (pp. 590–598)
 Official Report of the 1992 Olympic Games, v.5 (download, archive) (pp. 354, 386–400)
 Official Report of the 1996 Olympic Games, v.3 (download, archive) (pp. 56–73)

Official Results Books (IOC)
PDF documents in the LA84 Foundation Digital Library:
 Official Results Book – 2000 Olympic Games – Water Polo (download, archive)
 Official Results Book – 2004 Olympic Games – Water Polo (download, archive)
 Official Results Book – 2008 Olympic Games – Water Polo (download, archive)

PDF documents on the FINA website:
 Official Results Book – 2012 Olympic Games – Diving, Swimming, Synchronised Swimming, Water Polo (archive) (pp. 284–507)

PDF documents in the Olympic World Library:
 Official Results Book – 2016 Olympic Games – Water Polo (archive)

PDF documents on the International Olympic Committee website:
 Official Results Book – 2020 Olympic Games – Water Polo (archive)

Official Reports (FINA)
PDF documents on the FINA website:
 HistoFINA – Water polo medalists and statistics (as of September 2019) (archive) (pp. 4–13, 56)
 1870–2020 | 150 years of Water Polo – Evolution of its rules (archive)

Official website (IOC)
Water polo on the International Olympic Committee website:
 Water polo
 Men's water polo
 Women's water polo

Olympedia
Water polo on the Olympedia website:

 Water polo
 Men's water polo
 Women's water polo
 Athlete count for water polo
 Water polo venues
 Water polo at the 1900 Summer Olympics (men's tournament)
 Water polo at the 1904 Summer Olympics (men's tournament)
 Water polo at the 1908 Summer Olympics (men's tournament)
 Water polo at the 1912 Summer Olympics (men's tournament)
 Water polo at the 1920 Summer Olympics (men's tournament)
 Water polo at the 1924 Summer Olympics (men's tournament)
 Water polo at the 1928 Summer Olympics (men's tournament)
 Water polo at the 1932 Summer Olympics (men's tournament)
 Water polo at the 1936 Summer Olympics (men's tournament)
 Water polo at the 1948 Summer Olympics (men's tournament)
 Water polo at the 1952 Summer Olympics (men's tournament)
 Water polo at the 1956 Summer Olympics (men's tournament)
 Water polo at the 1960 Summer Olympics (men's tournament)
 Water polo at the 1964 Summer Olympics (men's tournament)
 Water polo at the 1968 Summer Olympics (men's tournament)
 Water polo at the 1972 Summer Olympics (men's tournament)
 Water polo at the 1976 Summer Olympics (men's tournament)
 Water polo at the 1980 Summer Olympics (men's tournament)
 Water polo at the 1984 Summer Olympics (men's tournament)
 Water polo at the 1988 Summer Olympics (men's tournament)
 Water polo at the 1992 Summer Olympics (men's tournament)
 Water polo at the 1996 Summer Olympics (men's tournament)
 Water polo at the 2000 Summer Olympics (men's tournament, women's tournament)
 Water polo at the 2004 Summer Olympics (men's tournament, women's tournament)
 Water polo at the 2008 Summer Olympics (men's tournament, women's tournament)
 Water polo at the 2012 Summer Olympics (men's tournament, women's tournament)
 Water polo at the 2016 Summer Olympics (men's tournament, women's tournament)
 Water polo at the 2020 Summer Olympics (men's tournament, women's tournament)

Sports Reference
Water polo on the Sports Reference website:

 Country Medal Leaders & Athlete Medal Leaders (1900–2016) (archived)
 Men's water polo (1900–2016) (archived)
 Women's water polo (2000–2016) (archived)
 Water polo at the 1900 Summer Games (men's tournament) (archived)
 Water polo at the 1904 Summer Games (men's tournament) (archived)
 Water polo at the 1908 Summer Games (men's tournament) (archived)
 Water polo at the 1912 Summer Games (men's tournament) (archived)
 Water polo at the 1920 Summer Games (men's tournament) (archived)
 Water polo at the 1924 Summer Games (men's tournament) (archived)
 Water polo at the 1928 Summer Games (men's tournament) (archived)
 Water polo at the 1932 Summer Games (men's tournament) (archived)
 Water polo at the 1936 Summer Games (men's tournament) (archived)
 Water polo at the 1948 Summer Games (men's tournament) (archived)
 Water polo at the 1952 Summer Games (men's tournament) (archived)
 Water polo at the 1956 Summer Games (men's tournament) (archived)
 Water polo at the 1960 Summer Games (men's tournament) (archived)
 Water polo at the 1964 Summer Games (men's tournament) (archived)
 Water polo at the 1968 Summer Games (men's tournament) (archived)
 Water polo at the 1972 Summer Games (men's tournament) (archived)
 Water polo at the 1976 Summer Games (men's tournament) (archived)
 Water polo at the 1980 Summer Games (men's tournament) (archived)
 Water polo at the 1984 Summer Games (men's tournament) (archived)
 Water polo at the 1988 Summer Games (men's tournament) (archived)
 Water polo at the 1992 Summer Games (men's tournament) (archived)
 Water polo at the 1996 Summer Games (men's tournament) (archived)
 Water polo at the 2000 Summer Games (men's tournament, women's tournament) (archived)
 Water polo at the 2004 Summer Games (men's tournament, women's tournament) (archived)
 Water polo at the 2008 Summer Games (men's tournament, women's tournament) (archived)
 Water polo at the 2012 Summer Games (men's tournament, women's tournament) (archived)
 Water polo at the 2016 Summer Games (men's tournament, women's tournament) (archived)

Todor66
Water polo on the Todor66 website:

 Water polo at the Summer Games
 Water polo at the 1900 Summer Olympics (men's tournament)
 Water polo at the 1904 Summer Olympics (men's tournament)
 Water polo at the 1908 Summer Olympics (men's tournament)
 Water polo at the 1912 Summer Olympics (men's tournament)
 Water polo at the 1920 Summer Olympics (men's tournament)
 Water polo at the 1924 Summer Olympics (men's tournament)
 Water polo at the 1928 Summer Olympics (men's tournament)
 Water polo at the 1932 Summer Olympics (men's tournament)
 Water polo at the 1936 Summer Olympics (men's tournament)
 Water polo at the 1948 Summer Olympics (men's tournament)
 Water polo at the 1952 Summer Olympics (men's tournament)
 Water polo at the 1956 Summer Olympics (men's tournament)
 Water polo at the 1960 Summer Olympics (men's tournament)
 Water polo at the 1964 Summer Olympics (men's tournament)
 Water polo at the 1968 Summer Olympics (men's tournament, men's qualification)
 Water polo at the 1972 Summer Olympics (men's tournament, men's qualification)
 Water polo at the 1976 Summer Olympics (men's tournament, men's European qualification)
 Water polo at the 1980 Summer Olympics (men's tournament, men's European qualification, men's world qualification)
 Water polo at the 1984 Summer Olympics (men's tournament, men's qualification)
 Water polo at the 1988 Summer Olympics (men's tournament, men's qualification)
 Water polo at the 1992 Summer Olympics (men's tournament, men's qualification)
 Water polo at the 1996 Summer Olympics (men's tournament, men's qualification)
 Water polo at the 2000 Summer Olympics (men's tournament, men's qualification, women's tournament, women's qualification)
 Water polo at the 2004 Summer Olympics (men's tournament, men's qualification, women's tournament, women's qualification)
 Water polo at the 2008 Summer Olympics (men's tournament, men's qualification, women's tournament, women's qualification)
 Water polo at the 2012 Summer Olympics (men's tournament, men's qualification, women's tournament, women's qualification)
 Water polo at the 2016 Summer Olympics (men's tournament, men's qualification, women's tournament, women's qualification)
 Water polo at the 2020 Summer Olympics (men's tournament, men's qualification, women's tournament, women's qualification)

External links
 Official website

 
Olympics
Sports at the Summer Olympics
Olympics